Victor Mercer (born November 16, 1980), better known by his stage name Celph Titled, is an American rapper and record producer who is a member of the hip hop supergroup Army of the Pharaohs, as well as the Demigodz along with Connecticut rapper Apathy, Ryu from Get Busy Committee, and rapper Blacastan and Esoteric.

Mercer moved to New York City and began working as an in-house producer and A&R. The now-defunct BUDS International and Bronx Science Records released all of his early records on vinyl, including those of his original group, Equilibrium, and singles from his longstanding partner, Apathy. Grammy Award-winner Mike Shinoda, of Linkin Park, invited Mercer to join his Los Angeles cohorts, Styles of Beyond, as an official part of Fort Minor's album The Rising Tied (2005).

After working with DJ Green Lantern on the Invasion "Fort Minor: We Major" mixtape, Mercer embarked on a nationwide tour with Fort Minor in 2006. Mercer released The Gatalog, a four-disc set of his guest appearances and freestyles, going back to his early releases from 1998, as his official first offering to a thriving fanbase that already viewed him as a seasoned veteran. After the release of The Gatalog and a move back to Tampa, Mercer spent three years working with D.I.T.C. multi-platinum producer, Buckwild, on his first album, Nineteen Ninety Now, released on October 26, 2010, on No Sleep Recordings.

Early life
Celph Titled was born in Tampa, Florida, and grew up in Hillsborough County.

Career
Mercer moved to New York City and began working as an in-house producer and A&R. The now-defunct BUDS International and Bronx Science Records released all of his early records on vinyl, including those of his original group, Equilibrium, and singles from his longstanding partner, Apathy.

Grammy Award-winner Mike Shinoda, of Linkin Park, invited Mercer to join his Los Angeles cohorts, Styles of Beyond, as an official part of Fort Minor's album The Rising Tied (2005), released on Linkin Park's Machine Shop Recordings/Warner Bros. Records. Shinoda handled production for the album. Jay-Z, who worked with Linkin Park on their collaborative EP Collision Course, served as an executive producer for the album. Shinoda collaborated with many longtime friends (such as hip hop group Styles of Beyond, Jonah Matranga, Holly Brook and Linkin Park turntablist Joe Hahn), as well as many notable and underground hip-hop and R&B artists (such as Common, John Legend, Black Thought, Lupe Fiasco, Kenna, Eric Bobo, Sixx John and Celph Titled) for the album.

After working with DJ Green Lantern on the Invasion "Fort Minor: We Major" mixtape, Mercer embarked on a nationwide tour with Fort Minor in 2006. The mixtape was made as a warm-up/prequel to promote their first album The Rising Tied, and was first released on the internet as a free download.

Mercer released a compilation titled The Gatalog, a four-disc set of his guest appearances and freestyles, going back to his early releases from 1998, as his official first offering to a thriving fanbase that already viewed him as a seasoned veteran. After the release of The Gatalog and a move back to Tampa, Mercer spent three years working with the Diggin' In The Crates (D.I.T.C.) multi-platinum producer, Buckwild, on his first album, Nineteen Ninety Now, released on October 26, 2010, on No Sleep Recordings.

On January 14, 2013, Apathy confirmed that Killmatic would be released on March 5. Along with that, he confirmed the official album art. Four days later, Apathy, through his YouTube account, released the first single for Killmatic titled "Demigodz Is Back". On May 5, 2013, Demigodz released their second studio album titled Killmatic. It featured all members including Celph Titled, Apathy, Motive, Blacastan, Esoteric and Ryu. In Death Reborn, Army of the Pharaohs fourth studio album, is set to be released April, 2014 and is stated to have Celph Titled on the album. On November 30, 2013, Vinnie Paz revealed that two new Army Of The Pharaohs albums would be released in 2014. The first album; In Death Reborn is slated for a release on 22 April and the second LP is expected to drop in November. Celph Titled is confirmed to be on the upcoming albums; new members including Demigodz member Blacastan and Zilla from Houston, Texas are said to be joining the group.

Discography

Albums
 The Rubix Cuban (Unreleased)
 2006: The Gatalog: A Collection of Chaos 
 The Fresh Prince of Hell's Lair (Unreleased)

Collaborations

Army of the Pharaohs 
2006: The Torture Papers  
2007: Ritual of Battle 
2010: The Unholy Terror
2014: In Death Reborn
2014: Heavy Lies the Crown

Demigodz 
2007: The Godz Must Be Crazier (with Demigodz)
2013: Killmatic (with Demigodz)

Boss Hog Barbarians (with J-Zone) 
2006: Every Hog Has Its Day

With Apathy 
2006: No Place Like Chrome
TBA: Will Sing for Vengeance

With Buckwild 
2010: Nineteen Ninety Now
2011: Nineteen Ninety More

With Stu Bangas 
2022: New Unnamed Album

See also

 List of people from Tampa, Florida
 List of record producers
 Music of Florida
 Music of New York City

References

External links
 , his official website
 

American hip hop record producers
American male rappers
Army of the Pharaohs members
Living people
Underground rappers
Musicians from Tampa, Florida
Rappers from Florida
Southern hip hop musicians
American people of Cuban descent
Hispanic and Latino American rappers
21st-century American rappers
21st-century American male musicians
1980 births
Demigodz members